X/1106 C1,  also known as the Great Comet of 1106, was a great comet that appeared on 2 February  1106, and was observed around the world from the beginning of February through to mid-March. It was recorded by astronomers in Wales, England, Japan, Korea, China and Continental Europe. It was observed to split into many pieces, forming the Great Comet of 1882 and Comet Ikeya–Seki as well as over 4000 small sungrazing comets observed by the SOHO space telescope. It is a member of the Kreutz Group, known as Subfragment I, a split from an earlier large (~150 km) comet that progressively fragmented under the influence of the Sun.

Observations

Britain
A brief note in the Welsh manuscript known as the Brut y Tywysogion reads:
[-1106]. Yn y vlwydyn honno y gwelat seren anryued y gwelet yn anuon paladyr oheuni yn ol y chefyn ac o prafter colofyn y veint a diruawr oleuat idaw, yn darogan yr hyn a vei rac llaw: kanys Henri, amherawdyr Rufein, gwedy diruawryon vudugolyaetheu a chrefudussaf vched y Grist a orffowyssawd. A'e vab ynteu, wedy cael eistedua amherodraeth Rufein, a wnaethpwyt yn amherawdyr.

This translates into English as:
[-1106]. In that year there was seen a star wonderful to behold, throwing out behind it a beam of light of the thickness of a pillar in size and of exceeding brightness, foreboding what would come to pass in the future: for Henry, emperor of Rome, after mighty victories and a most pious life in Christ, went to his rest. And his son, after winning the seat of the empire of Rome, was made emperor.

The 1106 annal of the Peterborough Chronicle describes the comet. The Dorothy Whitlock translation reads:

In the first week of Lent, on the Friday, 16 February, in the evening, there appeared an unusual star, and for a long time after that it was seen shining a while every evening. This star appeared in the south-west; it seemed small and dark. The ray that shone from it, however, was very bright, and seemed to be like an immense beam shining north-east; and one evening it appeared as if this beam were forking into many rays toward the star from an opposite direction.

Japan
The most impressive observations of the comet come from the Japanese chronicle  Dainihonshi. The chronicle reported that on 7 February 1106 AD the gigantic comet appeared in the southwest and stretched across a massive portion of the sky towards the east. The brilliant comet was described as white and with a tail stretching 100 degrees across the entire sky.

China
An excerpt from a Chinese manuscript describes the following report of a comet in 1106, mentioning the comet's breakup after perihelion, dated February 10:

In the reign of Hwuy Tsung, the 5th year of the epoch of Tsung Ning, the 1st moon [February], day Woo Seuh (Feb. 10th), a comet appeared in the west. It was like a great Pei Kow. The luminous envelope was scattered. It appeared like a broken-up star. It was 60 [degrees] in length and was 3 [degrees] in breadth. Its direction was to the north-east. It passed S.D. Kwei (southern Andromeda/northern Pisces). It passed S.D. Lew (Southern Aries), Wei (Pegasus), Maou, and Peih (Taurus). It then entered into the clouds and was no more seen.

Vietnam
The Vietnamese Annals Đại Việt sử ký toàn thư also recorded the comet event:

"Bính Tuất, năm thứ 6 mùa xuân, tháng giêng, sao chổi mọc ở phương Tây đuôi dài khắp nơi."(At year Binh Tuat (Fire Dog), in spring January, there is a comet in the West with long radiant tail) 

Others
Sigebert of Gembloux mentions it in his Chronicon sive Chronographia (pub. 1111).
De Significatione Cometarum
 Anales Toledanos I (c. 1219)
Dainihonshi（大日本史） (1715)
Wenxian Tongkao（文獻通考） (1308) 
History of Song（宋史） (1345)
Xu Tongjian Gangmu（續通鑒綱目） (1476)

Resources
Thomas Jones,  Brut y Tywysogion, or, the Chronicle of the Princes: Red Book of Hergest version'', University of Wales Press, Cardiff, 1955.
Comet X/1106 C1: Publication der Sternwarte in Kiel, No. 6, pp. 1–66, and AN 238 (1930 Jun 5), pp. 403–4

References

Sources
Historic astronomical observations in Wales
SOHO-620: A Comet on the Right(hand) Track
http://cometography.com/lcomets/1106c1.html

Kreutz Sungrazers
12th century in science
1106 in Asia
Non-periodic comets
06
1106 in Europe
Great comets
Henry IV, Holy Roman Emperor
Henry V, Holy Roman Emperor